The year 1710 in architecture involved some significant events.

Buildings and structures

Buildings

Cathedral of Saint Virgin Mary, Minsk.
Fifth Chapel of Versailles completed by Robert de Cotte.
Granada Cathedral completed.
Yeni Valide Mosque, Istanbul, completed.
Karlskirche (Kassel), designed by Paul du Ry, built.
Paoay Church on Luzon in the Philippines completed.
Gravisi–Barbabianca Palace, Capodistria, rebuilt.
Mansion House, Dublin, Ireland, built as a private residence.
Ca' Pesaro on the Grand Canal (Venice) completed by Gian Antonio Gaspari to the 1659 design of Baldassarre Longhena.

Births
July 1 – , French architect (died 1802)
Approximate date – Antonio Rinaldi, Italian-born architect (died 1794)

Deaths
January 1 – William Bruce, Scottish architect (born c.1630)
December 10 – Robert Mylne, Scottish stonemason and architect (born 1633)
December 14 – Henry Aldrich, English polymath and amateur architect (born 1647)

References

architecture
Years in architecture
18th-century architecture